Truck Festival is an annual independent music festival in Oxfordshire, England.  It was started in 1998 by the Bennett family (including the brothers Robin and Joe of the band Goldrush), who decided that mainstream festivals such as Glastonbury had become too commercial and predictable, however since 2012 it was sold off and is now more commercial. It is held in July at Hill Farm in Steventon, which lies between Abingdon, Didcot and Wantage. The festival also gave birth to the Truck Records label in 1999.

The main stage was originally constructed from three large flatbed trucks, and a common misperception is that this is where the name of the festival comes from. However, in 2007 Robin Bennett wrote on the official Truck website: "Contrary to popular belief, the name Truck actually came from a compilation CD I picked up, 'Ten Trucking Greats', the soundtrack of the movie Convoy."

Overview
Truck has grown somewhat since its inception, but with an annual attendance of around 30,000 it is dwarfed by the likes of Glastonbury (around 210,000 people) and Reading/Leeds. Part of Truck's appeal for fans is that it can be viewed as a microcosm of these larger festivals, with a similar layout and facilities but on a more manageable scale. Due to a variety of factors, chiefly the layout of Hill Farm, it is highly unlikely that Truck has any potential for significant growth in the near future.

Hill Farm remains very much a working farm, shutting down only temporarily to allow the festival to take place each year. One of Truck's six stages is the so-called "Barn That Cannot Be Named"—a cow-shed with a stage set up at one end—which, despite the rich smell of manure, remains an ever-popular place to watch bands at the festival. The Barn mainly plays host to metal, emo, hardcore and punk acts during the day, then on Saturday evening turns into an arena for drum and bass and other dance music, returning to its rock incarnation on Sunday.

Other stages include Trailer Park (renamed The Village Pub in 2008), a marquee in the main arena which features the more esoteric indie bands during the day, and breakbeat on Saturday night; the Lounge (renamed the Beat Hive in 2008), a smaller marquee which used to specialise in more ambient and chilled performances during the day, and trance during the night but now plays host to a number of local, national, and international bands and DJs as well as a range of electronic music; the Market tent, which is set in the market area a short walk from the main field and features mainly folk-oriented music, becoming a retro disco/karaoke venue on Saturday night; and the Theatre/Fringe tent (renamed the Pavilion in 2008), which hosts non-musical acts such as theatrical performances, stand-up comedy, performance art and spoken-word performers.

The festival prides itself on its family atmosphere, with all of the site services being provided by local groups: the food stall is run by the local Rotary Club, and ice cream is sold by the local vicar. All profits from the festival go to charity.

A compilation album is released each year on Truck Records to coincide with the festival, featuring tracks (mainly studio recordings) from various bands playing at the festival.

A number of sister festivals have been launched in recent years. The annual Wood festival, at Braziers Park in Oxfordshire, was first held in 2008 and is run with an emphasis on the environment. EquiTruck has been held in January every year since 2006, at the midpoint between Truck Festivals, and is run by the Truck Festival bar staff. UniTruck was created out of the abandoned 2007 Truck Festival, which had to be moved to Oxford Brookes University at short notice. The first two festivals (in July and November 2007) were held at Oxford Brookes, followed by an event in December 2007 at Bucks New University in High Wycombe, which has become an annual event (now in November). Truck America was launched in April 2010, at the Full Moon Resort in New York City.

After a difficult 2011, with poor ticket sales threatening the future of the festival, Robin and Joe Bennett announced they would be stepping down. The festival continued in 2012 under the management of the Y Not Festival and the event was sold out. Superstruct Entertainment, the live entertainment platform backed by Providence Equity Partners, owns the festival after it entered definitive agreement for the acquisition of several live music and entertainment festivals from Global Media & Entertainment and Broadwick Live in April 2019.

In 2019 the capacity of the festival was 10,000.

Years

Truck One

Was held on 22 September 1998.

Truck stage

Truck Two

Now extended to two days, Truck Two was held on the weekend of 10–11 July 1999

Sunday night headliners were King Prawn.  Other acts included Black Candy, Lab-4 and Dustball.

Truck stage

Barn stage

Tickets cost £5 for the weekend.

Truck Three

On the weekend of 22–23 July 2000. Bands that played included The Blue Aeroplanes and Rothko.

Truck stage

Barn stage

Tickets cost £10 for the weekend.

Truck Four

On the weekend of 21–22 July 2001, Truck was headlined by The Rock of Travolta, who had recently supported Radiohead on their homecoming concert at South Park. The lineup included local bands such as Four Storeys and The Samurai Seven, as well as cult Glasgow band, Cannon and John Otway.

Truck stage

Barn stage

Tickets cost £15 for the weekend.

Truck Five

Truck Five took place on 20–21 July 2002. As usual, the lineup was largely taken from the local music scene, including bands like Meanwhile, back in Communist Russia... and Eeebleee, but also with upcoming bands from further afield such as Lapsus Linguae.

Other acts included were; Antonia, Black Nielson, Caretaker, Cat on Form, Chris TT, Dustball, Finlay, Edible 5 ft Smiths, Fonda 500, Goldrush, Jetplane Landing, Jim Crosskey, KTB, Lapsus Linguae, Lightyear, Luke Smith, Mountain Men Anonymous, National Prayer Breakfast, Pug, The Rock of Travolta, Rachel Dadd, Scott Parker, Six Ray Sun, 65 Days of Static, South Sea Company Prospectus, Toby Kidd, Torqmada and The Young Knives.

Truck stage

Barn stage

Trailerpark Tent

Tickets cost £15 if they were bought before the end of June 2002, rising to £20 after.

Truck Six

19–20 July 2003 saw bands like British Sea Power and The Futureheads supporting Goldrush, who teamed up with Mark Gardener from Oxford band Ride to headline the festival.

Tickets cost £20 for the weekend if bought before the end of June 2003 rising to £25 after.

Truck Seven

Held on the weekend of 24–25 July 2004

Acts who played included; Goldrush, Buck 65, Cristian Vogel, Chip Taylor and Carrie Rodriguez, Black Nielson, KTB, Dive Dive, Chris T-T, Kaito, MC Lars, Trademark, Toulouse, Days of Grace, Tiger Club, eeeblee, Villa Real, Nervous Test Pilot, The Evenings, Piney Gir, Luke Smith, Igloo, I Love Lucy, Black Madonnas, Swearing at Motorists, Sunnyvale Noise Sub-Element, The Epsteins, The Shit, Stars of Aviation, Lach, Kate Garrett, Thomas Truax, Chantelle Pike, The Mon£yshots The Henry Big Band, The Orff Orchestra, and The Schla la las.

Tickets cost £25 if bought before the end of June 2004, rising to £35 after.

Truck Eight

In 2005 the event took place on 23–24 July and was headlined on Saturday night by Biffy Clyro and on Sunday by The Magic Numbers. Other acts near the top of the bill included The Raveonettes, MC Lars, Do Me Bad Things and Goldrush.

Tickets cost £27.50 for the weekend if bought before the end of June 2005 and £37.50 if bought after.

Truck Nine 

The 2006 festival took place on 22–23 July. Tickets went on sale online from 1 March and sold out in a record eight days, although to safeguard against complaints from locals that outsiders were taking over a small, local event, tickets were also available from 1 February at just eight Oxfordshire shops.

The headlining acts were The Futureheads on Saturday and Mystery Jets on Sunday. Other acts near the top of the bill included Hundred Reasons, ¡Forward, Russia!, Goldrush, Brakes, MC Lars, Skindred and Get Cape. Wear Cape. Fly (Saturday); and Regina Spektor, Young Knives, Seth Lakeman, The Electric Soft Parade, Buck 65 and Chicks on Speed (Sunday).

BBC 6 Music covered the festival for the first time, with Marc Riley and Andrew Collins among those in attendance. Truck Nine also abandoned the traditional early finish on Sunday night by allowing camping over two nights.

Tickets cost £40 for the weekend.

Truck Ten 

Truck Ten was originally scheduled for 21–22 July 2007. Tickets sold out in just three days. However, due to flooding (see 2007 United Kingdom floods), the festival was postponed the day before it was due to start. A replacement event was quickly arranged at Oxford Brookes University, featuring some of the bands who were scheduled to play the festival.

The festival was rescheduled for the reserve dates of 22–23 September (the anniversary weekend of the first festival in 1998), with tickets remaining valid. Most of the original published lineup were able to return, although notable exceptions included The Brian Jonestown Massacre, Hopewell, Jack Peñate, Lethal Bizzle, Chase & Status and DJ Fresh. Oxford band Foals' set had to be rearranged after fear for safety in the Trailer Park tent. Their set on Saturday night saw them perform to a packed barn full of ecstatic truckers. The headliners were Idlewild on Sunday, and Garth Hudson (formerly of The Band) on Saturday, backed by a group including his wife Maud on lead vocals, and members of Goldrush and Grand Drive. Other artists on the bill included Glenn Tilbrook, Goldrush, Brakes, The Electric Soft Parade, John Power, Pull Tiger Tail, Metronomy and Grand Drive. The festival also featured the last performance of The Schla La Las.

Tickets cost £55 for the weekend.

Truck Eleven 

Truck Eleven was held over the weekend of 19–20 July 2008. The Saturday headliners were The Lemonheads, whose performance included the entirety of their album It's a Shame About Ray. Sunday's headliners were Get Cape. Wear Cape. Fly, who first played the festival in 2004. Other acts included Altern-8, Camera Obscura, Dodgy, The Early Years, Emmy the Great, Fighting with Wire, Fonda 500, Neil Halstead, Eamon Hamilton, Kyte, Le Volume Courbe, Maps, Laura Marling, Ian McLagan and The Bump Band, Ruth Minnikin, Noah and the Whale, Okkervil River, Piney Gir, Ralfe Band, The Research, Ulrich Schnauss, Walter Schreifels (as Blimey and the Governors), Martin Simpson, Spectrum, Television Personalities, These New Puritans, Frank Turner and Youthmovies.

Tickets cost £60 for the weekend.

Truck stage

Truck Twelve

Truck Twelve took place on the weekend of 25–26 July 2009 The Saturday headliners were Ash, while local music stalwarts Supergrass closed proceedings on the Sunday night. Other acts included Red Light Company, Yacht, Errors, Mark Olson & Gary Louris, And So I Watch You from Afar, Broken Records, Sportsday Megaphone, Data.select.party, Pete Molinari, Pulled Apart by Horses, Chew Lips, Joe Allen Band, Calories, Mike Heron, The Candyskins, Disasteradio, Detroit Social Club, Panama Kings, KTB, Danny and the Champions of the World, Gabriel Minnikin, Holton's Opulent Oog, Nervous Test Pilot, Jali Fily Cissokho, Andrew Ferris and Ruth Minnikin & Her Bandwagon. Dial F for Frankenstein (an unsigned Oxford band) were the opening act in the Cow-Shed on the Saturday and were met by a huge turn out, the On the Sunday Rock Sound magazine and Bob Harris hosted the barn-stage and the solar-powered market stage respectively. A secret set was played by Frank Turner on the Sunday night, under the name Funk Tanker.

Truck stage

Tickets for Truck 12 cost £70 for the weekend with day tickets costing £40 each.

Truck Thirteen

Truck Thirteen took place over three days on 23–25 July, and was being headlined by Mew and Teenage Fanclub, and also featured Los Campesinos!, Thomas Truax, Blood Red Shoes, 65daysofstatic, Bellowhead, DJ Zinc and Ms. Dynamite, Fucked Up, Stornoway and a special appearance from Mercury Rev performing a live soundtrack to Kenneth Anger's occult movie Lucifer Rising, which was originally soundtracked by Bobby Beausoleil.

Tickets cost £80 for the weekend, with an additional £15 charge if the attendee wished to camp on the Friday night.

Truck Fourteen 

For the first time running over a full three days, 2011's festival also introduced a second stage curated by three record labels: Transgressive, Heavenly, and Bella Union. The line-up features Gruff Rhys, Bellowhead, Graham Coxon, Saint Etienne, John Grant, Philip Selway, Edwyn Collins, The Go! Team, Johnny Flynn, as well as dozens of other acts.

Weekend tickets cost £99, and day tickets cost £40 for Friday and £45 for Saturday and Sunday.

Truck Fifteen 

In January 2012 it was announced that Truck would return in 2012 under new management. The sold-out event took place on 20–21 July.

Main stage

Second stage

Barn stage

Truck Records
Truck Records was an independent record label based in Oxford, England. It grew out of the Truck Festival, held annually in Steventon, Oxfordshire. The festival and label were started (in 1998 and 1999 respectively) by the Bennett family, two of whom have formed the band The Dreaming, and were members of Goldrush.

Past and present artists on Truck Records include Goldrush, The Electric Soft Parade, MC Lars, Trademark, The Rock of Travolta, Meanwhile, Back in Communist Russia…, Black Nielson, Four Storeys, Fonda 500, The Black Madonnas, The Schla La Las and Piney Gir.

In 2005, the label was the subject of Channel 4 documentary  "The Business: Business or Pleasure".  The documentary covered the business's financial problems alongside the employees' motivation and love of the music industry.

See also

List of electronic music festivals

References

External links
 Official site

Music festivals in Oxfordshire
1998 establishments in England
Annual events in the United Kingdom
Electronic music festivals in the United Kingdom
Music festivals established in 1998
Indie rock festivals
Rock festivals in the United Kingdom